The term Christmas bombings usually refers to Operation Linebacker II.

It may also refer to:
Christmas Eve 2000 Indonesia bombings
Strasbourg Cathedral bombing plot, a 2000 attempted terrorism incident
Northwest Airlines Flight 253, a 2009 attempt to bomb an airplane over Detroit, Michigan
December 2011 Nigeria bombings
2020 Nashville bombing